Lojze Dolinar (April 19, 1893 – September 9, 1970) was a Slovenian sculptor recognized for his impact on local and global 19th and 20th century art. When he moved to America he worked in architectural plastic art and thereafter in antique and modern art. In 1931 he went to Belgrade and between World War I and World War II he became one of the most sought-out monument sculptors. In 1946 he joined the Belgrade Fine Arts Academy and three years later got a professorship there. Among others he was taught by Alojzij Repič and worked with Jože Plečnik.

Sculptures 

 The Blind One
 Portrait of Rihard Jakopič
 Dr. Janez Evalengelist Krek tombstone
 Statues in Slovenian Square
 2 Calvary monuments in Ljubljana
 Ivan Hribar, Sphinx and Joy
 Fallen student-soldiers monument
 Revolution Monument, Kranj
 Moses
 A Shepherd

In 1966 his works were showcased in a Kranj special museum at the Town Hall. In 1969 he received the Prešeren Award.

References 

1893 births
1970 deaths
Slovenian sculptors